Year 957 (CMLVII) was a common year starting on Thursday (link will display the full calendar) of the Julian calendar.

Events 
 By place 

 Europe 
 September 6 – Liudolf, the eldest son of King Otto I, dies of a violent fever near Pombia (it is rumored from a latent poison administered somehow by Berengar II's agents). The German armies return home, leaving Berengar of Ivrea in control of Italy. Liudolf is succeeded by his 3-year-old son Otto, who will be adopted and raised by his grandfather Otto, as the later duke of Swabia and Bavaria.
 Wilfred II, count of Besalú of the House of Barcelona, is killed by rebellious vassals. He is succeeded by his brother Sunifred II.

 England 
 Mercia and Northumbria rebel against King Eadwig and switch their allegiance to his brother Edgar. The English nobles (in support of the church) agree to divide the kingdom along the Thames River, with Eadwig keeping Wessex and Kent in the south and Edgar ruling in the north. Edgar's advisers recall Dunstan from Flanders (see 956).

 Japan 
 The Tenryaku era under the reign of Emperor Murakami ends. The Tentoku era begins (until 961).

 Caspian Sea 
957 Caspian Sea earthquake. It took place in the Caspian Sea and its vicinity. The earthquake is mentioned by several Arab and Syriac chronicle writers, who claimed that it mainly affected the region of Persian Iraq. The initial shocks lasted 40 days, but ceased for a while. The main earthquake then occurred, damaging the cities of Ray, Talikan, and Hulwan. A reported number of 150 villages were supposedly destroyed by the earthquake. 

 By topic 

 Religion 
 Olga of Kiev, ruler and regent of Kievan Rus', converts to the Eastern Orthodox Church, from paganism (approximate date).
 In China the Longquan Monastery is founded during the Liao Dynasty.

Births 
 Fujiwara no Junshi, Japanese empress consort (d. 1017)
 Fujiwara no Kinsue, Japanese statesman (d. 1029)
 Fujiwara no Sanesuke, Japanese nobleman (d. 1046)
 Fujiwara no Yoshikane, Japanese nobleman (d. 1021)
 Lu Zhen, Chinese scholar-official (approximate date)
 Wang Dan, Chinese politician and Grand Chancellor (d. 1017)

Deaths 
 January 16 – Abu Bakr Muhammad ibn Ali al-Madhara'i, Tulunid vizier (b. 871)
 June 14 – Guadamir, bishop of Vic (Spain)
 September 6 – Liudolf, duke of Swabia
date unknown
 Arinjaya, king of the Chola Kingdom (India)
 Istakhri, Persian traveler and geographer
 Marzuban ibn Muhammad, Sallarid ruler
 Ruzbahan, Buyid tax collector and general
 Wilfred II, count of Besalú (Spain)

References

Sources